2014 Final Four may refer to:
2014 NCAA Men's Division I Basketball Tournament
2014 NCAA Women's Division I Basketball Tournament